Ukraine national cerebral palsy football team is the national cerebral football team for Ukraine that represents the team in international competitions.  The country has appeared at the Paralympic Games in 2000, 2004, 2008 and 2012 where they have medaled each time.  At the 2015 IFCPF World Championships, Ukraine finished second.  This bettered the 2011 edition where they finished third.

Background 

National Paralympic Committee of Ukraine manages the national team. During the 2000s, the team was one of the top four most dominant teams in the world alongside Brazil, Russia and Iran. In 2011 and 2012, the team was coached by Sergiy Ovcharenko. Ukraine was active internationally by 2016, and had national championships to support national team player development. National team development is supported by an International Federation of Cerebral Palsy Football (IFCPF) recognized national championship.  Recognized years for the national IFCPF recognized competition include  2010, 2011, 2012, 2013, 2014, and 2015.

In 2016, after getting an endorsement by the World AntiDoping Agency (WADA), the IFCPF Anti-Doping Code was formally amended to allow for out of competition testing.  This was done through a WADA approved Whereabouts Programme managed through ADAMS. Drawing from players in a  Registered Testing Pool, players from this country were included ahead of the 2016 Summer Paralympics in Rio.

Ranking 

In 2016, the country was ranked 1st in the world by the IFCPF. In November 2014, the team was ranked number 2  in the world. In August 2013, the team was ranked number 2 in the world. In September 2012, the team was ranked number 2 in the world. In September 2011, the team was ranked number 1 in the world.

Players 
There have been a number of players for the Ukrainian squad.

Results 
Ukraine has participated in a number of international tournaments. Ukraine won the 2016 Pre-Paralympic Tournament in Salou, Spain after beating Brazil 0 - 2 in the final.

IFCPF World Championships 
Ukraine has participated in the IFCPF World Championships.  At the 2011 CP-ISRA World Championship in Drenthe,  Ukraine beat Canada 5 - 0.

Paralympic Games 
Ukraine has participated in 7-a-side football at the Paralympic Games.

Paralympic Results

References 

National cerebral palsy football teams
Ukraine at the Paralympics
C
Football 7-a-side teams at the 2000 Summer Paralympics
Football 7-a-side teams at the 2004 Summer Paralympics
Football 7-a-side teams at the 2008 Summer Paralympics
Football 7-a-side teams at the 2012 Summer Paralympics
Football 7-a-side teams at the 2016 Summer Paralympics